The Conway Junction Railroad Turntable Site is the foundational remnants of what was once a major railroad junction in South Berwick, Maine.  Consisting of a circular granite railroad turntable foundation and an engine house foundation, it is the only major surviving reminder of Great Falls and South Berwick Railroad.  The site was listed on the National Register of Historic Places in 1989.

Description and history
The turntable site is located at the southwest corner of Fife's Lane and Maine State Route 236, south of the village center of South Berwick. At the center is a granite pier, capped with concrete, on which the turntable was originally mounted. To the west of this structure is a three-sided granite foundation, which once supported a wedge-shaped engine house (a roundhouse). The turntable is believed to date to 1855.

The first railroad that came to South Berwick was the Portland, Saco and Portsmouth Railroad (PS&P), in 1842.  The Boston and Maine Railroad (B&M) extended its line eastward from Exeter, New Hampshire in 1843, meeting the PS&P in South Berwick village.  The Great Falls and South Berwick Railroad in about 1855 built a  spur line from the PS&P at this point to join with the B&M at Great Falls, and established its headquarters here, which became known as Conway Junction because the Great Falls and South Berwick connected near here to the Portsmouth, Great Falls and Conway Railroad with service to Conway, New Hampshire.  The rail lines in this area were used until 1936, and abandoned in 1941.  Route 236 was built over the PS&P right of way in the 1940s, around which time the turntable and engine house were dismantled, and the Great Falls and South Berwick right of way was also built over.  The foundations here are the only tangible remnants of this history.

See also
National Register of Historic Places listings in York County, Maine

References

Buildings and structures completed in 1855
Transportation buildings and structures in York County, Maine
South Berwick, Maine
National Register of Historic Places in York County, Maine
Railway roundhouses on the National Register of Historic Places
Railroad roundhouses in Maine
Railway turntables
Railway buildings and structures on the National Register of Historic Places in Maine
Industrial buildings and structures on the National Register of Historic Places in Maine